Ulysses' Gaze is a soundtrack album by Greek composer Eleni Karaindrou featuring music for the film Ulysses' Gaze by Theodoros Angelopoulos recorded in 1994 and released on the ECM New Series label.

Reception
The Allmusic review by Stacia Proefrock awarded the album 4½ stars stating "perhaps no previous Karaindrou score contains the evocative power of her compositions for Ulysses' Gaze, the film about memory, artistic quests, and war... The theme associated with "A," the central character who serves as the Ulysses of the film's title, is a constant repetitive framework upon which small vignettes of European folk music and elegiac song are built. The effect mirrors the film's journey across a portion of Europe torn apart by political divides and war, but more importantly provides small fragments of the pure images of peace and beauty that are so essential for Ulysses to find".

Track listing
All compositions by Eleni Karaindrou except as indicated
 "Ulysses' Theme" - 1:25 
 "Litany [Variation I]" - 3:12 
 "Ulysses' Theme [Variation I]" - 1:27 
 "Woman's Theme" - 1:10 
 "Ulysses' Theme [Variation II]" - 1:11 
 "Ulysses' Theme [Variation III]" - 1:33 
 "The River" - 5:01 
 "Ulysses' Theme" - 2:12 
 "Ulysses' Theme/Litany" - 6:55 
 "Ulysses' Gaze/Woman's Theme/Ulysses' Theme/Lento/Largo/Dance" - 17:03 
 "Byzantine Psalm" (Traditional) - 1:12 
 "Ulysses' Theme [Variation IV]" - 1:33 
 "Ulysses' Theme [Variation V]" - 1:32 
 "Ulysses' Theme [Variation VI]" - 3:36 
 "Ulysses' Theme/Lento/Largo" - 5:29 
 "Litany [Variation II]" - 3:31 
 "Ulysses' Theme [Variation VII]" - 1:31

Personnel
Kim Kashkashian — viola
Vangelis Christopoulos — oboe
Andreas Tsekouras — accordion
Sopcratis Anthis — trumpet
Vangelis Skouras — french horn
Christos Sfetsas — cello
Georgia Voulvi — voice
Lefteris Chalkiadakis — conductor

References

External links

ECM New Series albums
ECM Records soundtracks
Eleni Karaindrou albums
1995 albums
Albums produced by Manfred Eicher